Slovenska Bistrica is a town south of Maribor in eastern Slovenia. It is the seat of the Municipality of Slovenska Bistrica, one of the largest municipalities in Slovenia. The area is part of the traditional region of Styria. The town is included in the Drava Statistical Region.

History
The town was established in the 13th century on the trade road between Maribor and Celje. It was granted market rights in 1313. It was originally called just Bistrica. The present name of Slovenska Bistrica first appears in records dating from 1565.

Before 1918, the town had a German-speaking majority (in the last Austrian census of 1910, 57.7% of the inhabitants declared German as their language of daily communication), while the surroundings were almost exclusively Slovene-speaking.

Demographics
The town has a population of 8,016 (in 2018). Many locals commute to Maribor for work, less than an hour's drive away.

Landmarks
The town offers several interesting sights, including Bistrica Castle, churches, a Roman road, Ančnik fort (an Ancient Roman fort) and more. It is also a good starting point for people wishing to hike on Mount Boč, a nearby mountain peak and park.

Parish church
The parish church in the settlement is dedicated to Saint Bartholomew and belongs to the Roman Catholic Archdiocese of Maribor. It is first mentioned in written documents dating to 1240, but was greatly rebuilt and extended in the Baroque style in the 18th century. The belfry dates to the 19th century. Two other larger churches in the town are dedicated to Our Lady of the Seven Sorrows and Saint Joseph. They date to the 15th and 18th centuries.

Notable people
Notable people that were born or lived in Slovenska Bistrica include the following:
Herta Haas (1914–2010), one of the wives of Josip Broz Tito

References

External links

Slovenska Bistrica on Geopedia

 
Cities and towns in Styria (Slovenia)
Populated places in the Municipality of Slovenska Bistrica